"Mr. Moon" is a country music song written by Autry Inman and Carl Smith, recorded by Smith, and released on the Columbia label. In August 1951, it reached No. 4 on the country charts. It spent 17 weeks on the charts and was the No. 20 best selling country record of 1951.

See also
 List of Billboard Top Country & Western Records of 1951

References

1951 songs
Carl Smith (musician) songs
Songs written by Autry Inman